The La Jolla Historical Society is a private 501(c)(3) nonprofit organization in the La Jolla community within San Diego, California that is committed to the discovery, collection and preservation of La Jolla’s heritage through collections, programs and advocacy.

Programs and collections 
The La Jolla Historical Society envisions itself as a center for research and education about the history and stories of the La Jolla community, as an agent for positive impact as it relates to the built environment, and as an advocate for intergenerational and cultural understanding.

The La Jolla Historical Society produces a wide range of programs and events. Recent exhibitions have included: 
Climate Change: Midcentury Modern La Jolla (May–September 2014); Scripps on Prospect: Evolution of Villa and Cottage (September 2013-May 2014); Postmark La Jolla: History of the US Postal Service in La Jolla (Fall 2010); Waverider: Perspectives on Surfing La Jolla, 1930-1950 (Summer 2010); By the Beautiful Sea (June – September 2008); Merchants & Memories (February–May 2009); All Roads Lead to La Jolla: A Journey through our Automotive Past  (Dec 09 - Feb 2010); Waveriders: Perspective on Surfing in La Jolla 1930–1950 (May – July 2010); Identify: The Teenage Experience in La Jolla  (August – October 2010); Postmark La Jolla: History of the US Postal Service in La Jolla (Aug – Nov 2010); The Big Picture: Selections from the Oversized Image Collection (Oct – Nov 2010); La Jolla: Then & Now (June - Aug 2011)

Other activities include:
 Preserving a significant collection of photographic prints, audio and video recordings, real estate files, architectural drawings biographical files, books, newspapers, school yearbooks, art, printed ephemera and scrapbooks, manuscripts, artifacts
 Monitoring La Jolla’s historic sites and structures
 Recording and transcribing oral histories of long-time residents
 "Feasting on History," a fundraising event in local historic homes
 Ellen Browning Scripps Luncheon, commemorating La Jolla’s beloved philanthropist
 La Jolla Concours d'Elegance, nationally renowned fundraising event for car enthusiasts
 Secret Garden Tour of La Jolla, featuring beautiful homes, treasured gardens, and sustainable landscaping

Organizational history 
The La Jolla Historical Society was founded in 1963 by a small group of community leaders and local citizens dedicated to preserving the community’s rich heritage and culture. However, the work of the Society actually dates back to the late 1930s with the arrival in La Jolla of Howard S.F. Randolph. A historian and genealogist from New England, Randolph advocated greater recognition of local history in the community, particularly in La Jolla's development during the 1880s and ‘90s. Working with the Library Association of La Jolla, Randolph established a Historical Committee and gathered photographs and documentation to create his seminal book La Jolla: Year by Year (1946). The publication triggered increased interest in local history amongst La Jollans, culminating in a February 22, 1940, meeting in the Presbyterian Church attended by more than a hundred citizens to discuss La Jolla’s recorded past and how it might be best preserved. With the community’s support, Randolph’s collection grew, becoming the nucleus of the significant archival collection of images and documents that the Society maintains today.

La Jollans’ efforts supporting heritage education and preservation remained connected to the Library Association for years. In 1955, the Association financed a second edition of Randolph’s book and, by the 1960s, community members realized a separate organization was necessary to address the growing interest in La Jolla history. After the Society’s founding, the board of trustees of the Library Association in April 1964 gave the Historical Committee permission to transfer the Randolph Collection to the new organization. Articles of incorporation were filed on July 7, 1964, with the Society's first officers being Barbara Dawson (President), Hiomi Nakamura (Vice President), and A.B. Crosby (Secretary).

Throughout its history, the Society has operated out of numerous facilities, initially working from a room in the La Jolla Federal Savings & Loan building at 1100 Wall Street. It then met in private homes until 1968 when a small office was established at 7917 Girard Avenue.  In 1971, operations were moved to the La Jolla Public Library at 1010 Wall St. (location of the present-day Athenaeum). Six years later, the Society moved to the Colonial Inn.  Finally, in 1981, the Society moved to its current location in a 1909 cottage at 7846 Eads Avenue, located within the historically significant Scripps-Gill cultural complex in central La Jolla.

Today, the Society boasts nearly 900 members and has grown into a multi-faceted community organization with a growing slate of programs and an ambitious future. The La Jolla Historical Society envisions itself as a center for research and education about the history and stories of the La Jolla community, as an agent for positive impact as it relates to the built environment, and as an advocate for intergenerational and cultural understanding. It is a 501(c)(3) nonprofit corporation.

The Society’s Historic Structures

1904 Wisteria Cottage 

Located at 780 Prospect Street in the heart of the Scripps/Gill Cultural District, Wisteria Cottage is one of La Jolla’s most distinguishing structures, outstanding for its proximity to the ocean, rich architectural roots, and significance of past ownership and residents. Named for the wisteria-covered pergola in front of the entry, the Cottage was built in 1904 and acquired by the famous Scripps family only months after its completion. In 1909, acclaimed architect Irving Gill was commissioned to design a number of additions and modifications, including the trademark pergola.

In its hundred-plus year history, Wisteria Cottage has experienced a number of uses: guest house, temporary home for St. James by-the-Sea Church, the Balmer School (today’s La Jolla Country Day School), and two different bookstores. The Cottage was designated Historic Site No. 166 by the City of San Diego in the 1980s.

With the closing of Coles Bookstore in 2005, Wisteria Cottage began a new era as the home of the La Jolla Historical Society. In 2008, Ellen Revelle and her family made a bequest of the entire property to the Society.

Capital funding were raised and plans developed to renovate the campus buildings for use as a museum, education and research center, community gathering place, and archive storage. Construction was completed in 2014 to coincide with the Society's 50th Anniversary celebration.

The rehabilitated Wisteria Cottage serves as an interpretative space and a museum-standard exhibition gallery space.  The renovated conference room in the Balmer Annex provides improved facilities for meetings, workshops, educational programs, and community activities. Improvements to the Office and Research Center provide a conducive setting for members of the public to consult with the Society’s archivist and historian regarding information needs and access to archival materials.

1909 cottage 
In the early 1900s, La Jolla was a small beach-side town of a few dirt roads with horse-drawn carriages and about a hundred residential cottages, either rented or owned. Most cottages had one or two bedrooms with no plumbing or electricity. Typically, they were of simplistic exterior wood shingle construction and finished inside with wainscot and pine plank floors.

One such cottage was built in 1909 at 245 Prospect Street, utilized as a residence and rental for decades. The La Jolla Historical Society, which had been located in a small office at the Colonial Inn hotel on Prospect Street, acquired the cottage as the Society’s new home after discovering the cottage would be demolished to make room for a three-story condominium. In 1981, the cottage was moved a few blocks north on Prospect and around the corner to its current location at 7846 Eads Avenue by La Jolla developer Dewhurst & Associates. The expense of moving the cottage was provided by the Revelle Family, whose property the cottage now occupies, just down the hill from Wisteria Cottage. Once in place, plumbing and electricity was installed.

Over the past twenty-five years, in its adaptive reuse by the Society, the cottage has held archives collection files, staff offices of the executive director, office manager, archivist, and historian and accommodates a growing corps of volunteers. Work is located throughout four separate rooms, each retaining historical flavor with original wainscot and windows replete with “wavy” window glass –the effects of time on a century-old structure.

The Carriage House 
Ellen Browning Scripps owned an extensive tract of property along the La Jolla coastline that, in 1916, included her home, South Molton Villa (designed by Irving Gill) and several smaller buildings: a library, a guest bungalow, Wisteria Cottage, a lathe house, and a garage for her Pierce-Arrow. The structure that LJHS now calls the Carriage House was built in 1917 as a second garage for her chauffeur's car, a Ford.

The carriage house is characteristic of the many small buildings constructed in La Jolla in the early 1900s, featuring single-wall construction with wood siding finishing the main façade. A high-pitched roof and garage entry doors allowed large carriages to come and go with ease. The rear of the structure contains a series of small partitions that may have been used as living quarters at some time. One window repeats the small triangular-topped panes also found in Wisteria Cottage.

References

External links 
 Official website
 La Jolla Concours D' Elegance

H
History of San Diego
Historical societies in California
Non-profit organizations based in San Diego